Roscoe Village can refer to:

United States
 Roscoe Village, a neighborhood in North Center, Chicago
Roscoe Village (Coshocton, Ohio), on the National Register of Historic Places